Mercedes J. Ruehl (born February 28, 1948) is an American screen,  stage, and television actress. She is the recipient of several accolades, including an Academy Award, a Golden Globe Award, a Tony Award, a Drama Desk Award, two Obie Awards, and two Outer Critics Circle Awards.

Ruehl is known for her leading performance in the play Lost in Yonkers (1990) and supporting performance in the film The Fisher King (1991). Her other film credits include Big (1988), Married to the Mob (1988), Last Action Hero (1993), Roseanna's Grave (1997), and Hustlers (2019).

Early life and education
Ruehl was born February 28, 1948, in Jackson Heights, Queens, New York City, to Mercedes J. Ruehl, a schoolteacher, and Vincent Ruehl, an FBI agent. Her father was of German and Irish descent and her mother was of Cuban and Irish descent. The family frequently moved during her childhood owing to Vincent Ruehl's assignments with the FBI, and lived in other states including Silver Spring, Maryland. She and her brother,  Peter, were raised Catholic.

She attended the College of New Rochelle and graduated in 1969 with a BA in English.

Career
Ruehl began her career in regional theatre with the Denver Center Theatre Company, taking odd jobs between engagements. In 1980, she was nearly cast in the sixth season of Saturday Night Live, losing her slot to Denny Dillon. Her first starring role on Broadway came in 1984's I'm Not Rappaport. She then went on to win the 1984 Obie Award for her performance in The Marriage of Bette and Boo and twenty years later, an Obie for Woman Before a Glass. She also received a 1991 Tony Award as Best Actress (Play) for Neil Simon's Lost in Yonkers and continued her role in the show during its tour with co-star Mercedes McCambridge. Her performances in two other plays earned her two other Tony nominations: in 1995, as Best Actress (Featured Role – Play) for a revival of The Shadow Box; and in 2002, as Best Actress (Play) for Edward Albee's The Goat, or Who is Sylvia?.

Her most acclaimed film role was in The Fisher King; her performance in the film earned her the 1991 Academy Award for Best Supporting Actress as well as an American Comedy Award, a Boston Society of Film Critics Award, a Los Angeles Film Critics Association Award, and a Golden Globe. Earlier she had won the 1989 National Society of Film Critics Award for Best Supporting Actress for her performance in Married to the Mob. She played KACL station manager Kate Costas in five episodes of Frasier, and had a major role in the made-for-TV film All-American Girl: The Mary Kay Letourneau Story. In 2005, she (along with Esai Morales) received the Rita Moreno HOLA Award for Excellence from the Hispanic Organization of Latin Actors. She later played the mother of main character Vincent Chase in HBO's Entourage.

In 2009, she returned to the stage in Manhattan Theater Club's production of Richard Greenberg's The American Plan playing the role of Eva Adler. The production opened at the Samuel J. Friedman Theatre and the limited engagement ran From January 22 until March 22. In his rave review in The New York Times, Ben Brantley called Ruehl's performance "masterly". Ruehl next appeared in the drama/horror film What Ever Happened to Barker Daniels?, which was released in 2009. In January 2011, Ruehl starred in Sarah Treem's play The How and The Why, directed by Emily Mann at McCarter Theatre of Princeton University.

Ruehl appeared in the role of Ma in Harvey Fierstein's revamped and renamed revival of his play Torch Song Off-Broadway at Second Stage Theater. The play began previews on September 26, and opened officially on October 19, 2017. The production later transferred to Broadway.

Ruehl is on the faculty of HB Studio in New York City.

Personal life
In 1999, Ruehl married painter David Geiser with whom she had adopted a son, Jake (born 1995). She had another son, Christopher, whom she placed for adoption in 1976 when she was 28. They were reunited in the late 1990s when he turned 21, and later Christopher became Jake's godfather. Ruehl and Geiser put their Hampton house on the market in 2017; the same year Ruehl was quoted as saying that they were no longer together, but remained close. David Geiser died unexpectedly of heart disease in his sleep at home on October 14, 2020, at the age of 73.

Her brother, Peter, moved to Australia in 1987 where he was a popular newspaper columnist until his death in 2011.

Filmography

Film

Television

Theater 
{| class="wikitable"
!Year
!Title
!Role
!Venue 
!Refs
|-
|1985
|Coming of Age in Soho
|Patricia
|rowspan=2|Public Theatre
|rowspan=18|
|-
|1985
|The Marriage of Bette and Boo
|Joan Brennan
|-
|1985–88
|I'm Not Rappaport
|Clara
|Booth Theatre, Broadway
|-
|1988
|American Notes'
|Karen
|The Public Theatre
|-
|1989
|Other People's Money|Kate Sullivan
|Minetta Lane Theatre, Off-Broadway
|-
|1991
|Lost in Yonkers|Bella Kurnitz
|Richard Rodgers Theatre
|-
|1992
|Antony and Cleopatra|Cleopatra
|Actors Theater, Louisville
|-
|1994–95
|The Shadow Box|Beverly
|rowspan=2|Circle in the Square Theatre, Broadway
|-
|1995
|The Rose Tattoo|Serafina Delle Rose
|-
|2000
|The Vagina Monologues|Monologist
|Westside Theatre, Off-Broadway
|-
|2000–01
|Who's Afraid of Virginia Woolf?|Martha
|Guthrie Theater. Minneapolis 
|-
|2002
|The Goat, or Who Is Sylvia?|Stevie
|John Golden Theatre, Broadway
|-
|2005
|Woman Before a Glass|Peggy Guggenheim
|Promenade Theater, Off-Broadway
|-
|2009
|The American Plan|Eva Adler
|Samuel J. Friedman Theatre, Broadway
|-
|2010
|Edward Albee's Occupant|Louise Nevelson
|Peter Norton Space
|-
|2012
|The How and the Why|Zelda Kahn
|McCarter Theatre, New Jersey 
|-
|2015
|Full Gallop|Diana Vreeland
|Old Globe Theatre, California 
|-
|2017–19
|Torch Song|Ma Beckoff
|Second Stage Theater, Off-Broadway Helen Hayes Theatre, Broadway
|}

 Awards and nominations 

References

External links

 
 
 
 
 Ruehl Rules, a May 2005 Playbill article
 Brief Encounter with Mercedes Ruehl,  a May 2002 Playbill'' interview

Living people
20th-century American actresses
21st-century American actresses
Actresses from New York City
American entertainers of Cuban descent
American film actresses
American people of German descent
American people of Irish descent
American Roman Catholics
American stage actresses
American television actresses
Best Supporting Actress Academy Award winners
Best Supporting Actress Golden Globe (film) winners
College of New Rochelle alumni
Drama Desk Award winners
Hispanic and Latino American actresses
People from Jackson Heights, Queens
Tony Award winners
People from the Bronx
1948 births